Heinrich Martin Weber (5 March 1842, Heidelberg, Germany – 17 May 1913, Straßburg, Alsace-Lorraine, German Empire, now Strasbourg, France) was a German mathematician. Weber's main work was in algebra, number theory, and analysis. He is best known for his text Lehrbuch der Algebra published in 1895 and much of it is his original research in algebra and number theory. His work Theorie der algebraischen Functionen einer Veränderlichen (with Dedekind) established an algebraic foundation for Riemann surfaces, allowing a purely algebraic formulation of the Riemann–Roch theorem. Weber's research papers were numerous, most of them appearing in Crelle's Journal or Mathematische Annalen. He was the editor of Riemann's collected works.

Weber was born in Heidelberg, Baden, and entered the University of Heidelberg in 1860. In 1866 he became a privatdozent, and in 1869 he was appointed as extraordinary professor at that school. Weber also taught in Zurich at the Federal Polytechnic Institute (today the ETH Zurich), at the University of Königsberg, and at the Technische Hochschule in Charlottenburg. His final post was at the Kaiser-Wilhelm-Universität Straßburg, Alsace-Lorraine, where he died.

In 1893 in Chicago, his paper Zur Theorie der ganzzahligen algebraischen Gleichungen was read (but not by him) at the International Mathematical Congress held in connection with the World's Columbian Exposition. In 1895 and in 1904 he was president of the Deutsche Mathematiker-Vereinigung. His doctoral students include Heinrich Brandt, E. V. Huntington, Louis Karpinski, and Friedrich Levi.

Publications
 with Richard Dedekind: Theorie der algebraischen Functionen einer Veränderlichen. J. Reine Angew. Math. 92 (1882) 181–290
 Elliptische Functionen und algebraische Zahlen. Braunschweig 1891
 Encyklopädie der Elementar-Mathematik. Ein Handbuch für Lehrer und Studierende. Leipzig 1903/07, (Vol. 1, Vol. 2, Vol. 3) (in German)
 with Bernhard Riemann (i.e. partly based on Riemann's lectures): Die partiellen Differential-Gleichungen der mathematischen Physik. Braunschweig 1900-01
 Lehrbuch der Algebra. Braunschweig 1924, ed. Robert Fricke

 The third volume is an expanded version of his earlier book "Elliptische Functionen und algebraische Zahlen".

See also
Kronecker–Weber theorem
Weber's theorem
Weber's modular function
Weber function
Weber vector

References

 

1842 births
1913 deaths
19th-century German mathematicians
20th-century German mathematicians
Algebraists
Number theorists
Scientists from Heidelberg
People from the Grand Duchy of Baden
Heidelberg University alumni
Academic staff of Heidelberg University
Academic staff of the University of Königsberg
Academic staff of the Technical University of Berlin
Academic staff of the University of Strasbourg
Heads of universities in Germany
Academic staff of ETH Zurich
Members of the Royal Society of Sciences in Uppsala